The 2019–20 season was Accrington Stanley's second season in League One and their 51st year in existence. Along with competing in League One, the club also participated in the FA Cup, EFL Cup, and EFL Trophy. The season covers the period from 1 July 2019 to 30 June 2020.

Transfers

Transfers in

Loans in

Loans out

Transfers out

Pre-season
Stanley have announced pre-season friendlies against Sligo Rovers, Marseille, Bala Town, Warrington Town and Morecambe.

Competitions

League One

League table

Result summary

Results by matchday

Matches
On Thursday, 20 June 2019, the EFL League One fixtures were revealed.

August

September

October

November

December

January

February

March

April

May

FA Cup

The first round draw was made on 21 October 2019.

EFL Cup

The first round draw was made on 20 June.

EFL Trophy

On 9 July 2019, the pre-determined group stage draw was announced with Invited clubs to be drawn on 12 July 2019. The draw for the second round was made on 16 November 2019 live on Sky Sports. The third round draw was confirmed on 5 December 2019.

Statistics

Appearances and goals

|-
! colspan=14 style=background:#dcdcdc; text-align:center| Goalkeepers
                                 

|-
! colspan=14 style=background:#dcdcdc; text-align:center| Defenders

|-
! colspan=14 style=background:#dcdcdc; text-align:center| Midfielders

|-
! colspan=14 style=background:#dcdcdc; text-align:center| Forwards

|-
! colspan=14 style=background:#dcdcdc; text-align:center| Players transferred out during the season

|}

Disciplinary record

References

Accrington Stanley
Accrington Stanley F.C. seasons